FK Željezničar is a football club in Bosnia and Herzegovina. This article summarizes statistics from the 2015–16 football season.

Squad statistics

Players

 

Total squad cost: €8.33M

From the youth system

Disciplinary record
Includes all competitive matches. The list is sorted by position, and then shirt number.

Transfers

In 

Total expenditure:

Out 

Total income:  €1.115.000

Club

Coaching staff
{|
|valign="top"|

Other information

 (Interim)

Competitions

Pre-season

Mid-season

Overall

Premijer Liga BiH

Results summary

Results by round

Matches

Kup Bosne i Hercegovine

Round of 32

Round of 16

Quarter-finals

Semi-finals

UEFA Europa League

First qualifying round

Second qualifying round

Third qualifying round

UEFA Youth League

Players

Total squad cost: €1.25M

First round

References

FK Željezničar Sarajevo seasons
Zeljeznicar